Sean Cody (company name: MG Premium Ltd.) is a gay pornography label founded in fall 2001.  The website predominantly features young, muscular men in solo and hardcore bareback scenes. Sean Cody has a strict model selection, with contracts requiring no prior pornographic experience ("exclusive" men).

History
Sean Cody was run by the company Cody Media Inc from 2003 until 2015 where it was sold to porn conglomerate MindGeek (who owns other competitor studios such as Men.com). This raised some questions around the quality and exclusivity of the content, as the same parent company owned the content-sharing websites that have negatively affected many other studios. A 2014 article by Internet magazine Slate explained how "MindGeek has become the porn monopoly, putting industry members in the paradoxical position of working for the very company that profits from the piracy of their work."

In January 2012, SeanCody.com's parent company, 808 Holdings, filed suit in a federal court against 122 unidentified file sharers for allegedly trading unauthorized copies of the site's first condom-free video, "Brandon & Pierce Unwrapped", in December 2011. This was the first time Sean Cody sued over online file sharing.

Models
Sean Cody alumni include underwear model Simon Dexter; Aaron Savvy, a fitness model and Ultimate Fighter performer who has appeared on Hole in the Wall, a reality TV show; and Dayton O'Connor, Colby Keller, Paul Wagner, Brady Jensen, Brandon Cody, Ryan Rose, Justin Matthews, Jake Porter, Kaleb Stryker, Johnny Donovan and Ricky Donovan ("Dayton", "Colby", "Barry", "Jonah", "Cody", "Pierce", "Taylor", "Porter", "Kaleb", "Nixon", "Kellin", "Joey", "Dean", "Deacon" and "Asher" respectively), now professional porn actors. Dakota Cochrane, who appeared on the 15th season of The Ultimate Fighter on FX, modeled as "Danny" on Sean Cody during the latter half of 2007, a decision he now regrets.

"Sean" (real first name Ben) appeared on MTV's True Life in December 2015, in an episode entitled "I Am a Gay-for-Pay Porn Star," where he talks about his family and his career in gay porn. Fellow Sean Cody performer Forrest also appears in the episode.

See also

 List of gay pornographic magazines

References

External links

2001 establishments in California
Adult entertainment companies
American gay pornographic film studios
Companies based in San Diego
Entertainment companies based in California
Entertainment companies established in 2001
Gay male pornography websites
Mass media companies established in 2001
MindGeek
Pornography in California
American companies established in 2001